Circular Head Council is a local government body in Tasmania covering the far north-west mainland. It is classified as a rural local government area with a population of 8,066, and its major towns and localities include Arthur River, Marrawah and Stanley, with Smithton being the largest and principal town.  The origin of the name “Circular Head” is unknown.

History and attributes
Circular Head was established on 1 January 1907, the boundaries were altered in 1993 as part of a reorganisation. The region includes the smaller islands immediately off the north-west tip of the state including Robbins Island, Hunter Island and Three Hummock Island.

Circular Head is classified as rural, agricultural and large (RAL) under the Australian Classification of Local Governments.

Government

Localities

Not in above list
 Corinna
 Couta Rocks
 Meunna
 Milabena
 Sisters Creek
 Togari
 West Takone

See also
List of local government areas of Tasmania

References

External links

Circular Head Council official website
Local Government Association Tasmania
Tasmanian Electoral Commission - local government

 
Local government areas of Tasmania